The 2021 Cleveland Indians season was the 121st season for the franchise. It was the ninth season under the leadership of manager Terry Francona and sixth under general manager Mike Chernoff. The Indians played their home games at Progressive Field in Cleveland, Ohio.

This was the team's final season as under the name Indians. Following the season, the team became known as the Cleveland Guardians after decades of controversy surrounding the "Indians" name.

The Indians made MLB history by becoming the first team to be no-hit three times in a single season. Those three no-hitters came off of Carlos Rodón of the Chicago White Sox on April 14, Wade Miley of the Cincinnati Reds on May 7, and Corbin Burnes and Josh Hader of the Milwaukee Brewers on September 11. By coincidence, Zach Plesac was their starting pitcher in all three no-hitters.

Season standings

American League Central

American League Wild Card

Record against opponents

Game log

|- style="background:#fbb
| 1 || April 1 || @ Tigers || 2–3 || Boyd (1–0) || Bieber (0–1) || Soto (1) || 8,000 || 0–1 || L1
|- style="background:#fbb
| 2 || April 3 || @ Tigers || 2–5 || Teherán (1–0) || Plesac (0–1) || Garcia (1) || 8,000 || 0–2 || L2
|- style="background:#bfb
| 3 || April 4 || @ Tigers || 9–3 || Civale (1–0) || Norris (0–1) ||  || 8,000 || 1–2 || W1
|- style="background:#fbb
| 4 || April 5 || Royals || 0–3 || Duffy (1–0) || Allen (0–1) || Hahn (1) || 8,914 || 1–3 || L1
|- style="background:#bfb
| 5 || April 7 || Royals || 4–2 || Clase (1–0) || Holland (0–1) || Wittgren (1) || 5,908 || 2–3 || W1
|- style="background:#bfb
| 6 || April 9 || Tigers || 4–1 || Plesac (1–1) || Holland (0–1) || Clase (1) || 7,775 || 3–3 || W2
|- style="background:#bfb
| 7 || April 10 || Tigers || 11–3 || Civale (2–0) || Skubal (0–1) ||  || 7,570 || 4–3 || W3
|- style="background:#bfb
| 8 || April 11 || Tigers || 5–2 || Allen (1–1) || Urena (0–2) || Clase (2) || 6,859 || 5–3 || W4
|- style="background:#fbb
| 9 || April 12 || @ White Sox || 3–4 || Heuer (1–0) || Clase (1–1) ||  || 7,393 || 5–4 || L1
|- style="background:#bfb
| 10 || April 13 || @ White Sox || 2–0  || Bieber (1–1) || Crochet (0–2) || Karinchak (1) || 7,102 || 6–4 || W1
|- style="background:#fbb;"
| 11 || April 14 || @ White Sox || 0–8 || Rodón (2–0) || Plesac (1–2) ||  || 7,148 || 6–5 || L1
|- style="background: #bfb
| 12 || April 15 || @ White Sox || 4–2 || Civale (3–0) || Lynn (1–1) || Clase (3) || 7,049 || 7–5 || W1
|- style="background:#fbb
| 13 || April 16 || @ Reds || 3–10 || Hoffman (2–1) || Allen (1–2) ||  || 12,497 || 7–6 || L1
|- style="background:#fbb
| 14 || April 17 || @ Reds || 2–3  || Doolittle (2–0) || Pérez (0–1) ||  || 12,598 || 7–7 || L2
|- style="background:#bfb 
| 15 || April 18 || @ Reds || 6–3 || Bieber (2–1) || Miley (2–1) || Clase (4) || 12,551 || 8–7 || W1
|- style="background:#fbb
| 16 || April 20 || White Sox || 5–8 || Rodón (3–0) || Plesac (1–3) ||  || 4,176 || 8–8 || L1
|- style="background: #bbb
| — || April 21 || White Sox || colspan=7 | Postponed (rain) make-up date May 31
|- style="background:#fbb
| 17 || April 22 || Yankees || 3–6 || Germán (1–2) || Wittgren (0–1) || Chapman (3) || 6,380 || 8–9 || L2
|- style="background:#fbb;"
| 18 || April 23 || Yankees || 3–5 || Luetge (1–0) || Allen (1–3) || Chapman (4) || 8,662 || 8–10 || L3
|- style="background:#fbb
| 19 || April 24 || Yankees || 1–2 || Cole (3–1) || Bieber (2–2) || Loáisiga (1) || 8,817 || 8–11 || L4
|- style="background:#bfb
| 20 || April 25 || Yankees || 7–3 || Hentges (1–0) || Taillon (0–2) ||  || 8,766 || 9–11 || W1
|- style="background:#bfb
| 21 || April 26 || Twins || 5–3  || Clase (2–1) || Colomé (1–3) ||  || 4,555 || 10–11 || W2
|- style="background:#bfb
| 22 || April 27 || Twins || 7–4 || Civale (4–0) || Maeda (1–2) || Karinchak (2) || 6,303 || 11–11 || W3
|- style="background:#fbb 
| 23 || April 28 || Twins || 2–10 || Happ (2–0) || Allen (1–4) ||  || 5,903 || 11–12 || L1
|- style="background:#bfb 
| 24 || April 30 || @ White Sox || 5–3 || Bieber (3–2) || Keuchel (1–1) || Clase (5) || 9,405 || 12–12 || W1
|-

|- style="background:#fbb 
| 25|| May 1 || @ White Sox || 3–7 || Lynn (2–1) || McKenzie (0–1) ||  || 9,451 || 12–13 || L1
|- style="background:#bfb
| 26 || May 2 || @ White Sox || 5–0 || Plesac (2–3) || Giolito (1–3) ||  || 9,471 || 13–13 || W1
|- style="background:#bfb 
| 27 || May 3 || @ Royals || 8–6 || Shaw (1–0) || Junis (1–2) || Clase (6) || 6,919 || 14–13 || W2
|- style="background:#bfb
| 28 || May 4 || @ Royals || 7–3 || Wittgren (1–1) || Staumont (0–1) ||  || 5,997 || 15–13 || W3
|- style="background:#bfb 
| 29 || May 5 || @ Royals || 5–4 || Wittgren (2–1) || Davis (0–1) || Karinchak (3) || 9,640 || 16–13 || W4
|- style="background:#bfb 
| 30 || May 6 || @ Royals || 4–0 || McKenzie (1–1) || Duffy (4–2) ||  || 9,259 || 17–13 || W5
|- style="background:#fbb 
| 31 || May 7 || Reds || 0–3 || Miley (4–2) || Clase (2–2) ||  || 7,803 || 17–14 || L1
|- style="background:#bfb
| 32 || May 8 || Reds || 9–2 || Civale (5–0) || Castillo (1–4) ||  || 9,968 || 18–14 || W1
|- style="background:#bbb
| — || May 9 || Reds || colspan=7 | Postponed (rain) make-up date August 9
|- style="background:#bfb
| 33 || May 11 || Cubs || 3–2 || Bieber (4–2) || Alzolay (1–3) || Clase (7) || 8,024 || 19–14 || W2
|- style="background:#bfb 
| 34 || May 12 || Cubs || 2–1  || Karinchak (1–0) || Thompson (1–1) || — || 8,589 || 20–14 || W3
|- style="background:#bfb 
| 35 || May 13 || @ Mariners || 4–2 || Plesac (3–3) || Gilbert (0–1) || Shaw (1) || 9,880 || 21–14 || W4
|- style="background:#fbb 
| 36 || May 14 || @ Mariners || 3–7 || Flexen (4–1) || Civale (5–1) || Montero (5) || 10,014 || 21–15 || L1
|- style="background:#fbb
| 37 || May 15 || @ Mariners || 3–7 || Sheffield (3–3) || McKenzie (1–2) ||  || 10,311 || 21–16 || L2
|- style="background:#fbb
| 38 || May 16 || @ Mariners || 2–3 || Sewald (1–0) || Bieber (4–3) || Graveman (5) || 10,287 || 21–17 || L3
|- style="background:#fbb 
| 39 || May 17 || @ Angels || 4–7 || Watson (2–1) || Hentges (1–1) || Iglesias (7) || 9,527 || 21–18 || L4
|- style="background:#bfb
| 40 || May 18 || @ Angels || 6–5 || Plesac (4–3) || Claudio (0–1) || Karinchak (4) || 9,491 || 22–18 || W1
|- style="background:#bfb
| 41 || May 19 || @ Angels || 3–2 || Civale (6–1) || Watson (2–2) || Karinchak (5) || 10,378 || 23–18 || W2
|- style="background:#fbb 
| 42 || May 21 || Twins || 0–10 || Dobnak (1–3) || McKenzie (1–3) || — || 11,675 || 23–19 || L1
|- style="background:#bfb 
| 43 || May 22 || Twins || 5–3  || Karinchak (2–0) || Colomé (2–4) || — || 11,505 || 24–19 || W1
|- style="background:#fbb 
| 44 || May 23 || Twins || 5–8  || Robles (1–1) || Karinchak (2–1) || Duffey (1) || 9,805 || 24–20 || L1
|- style="background:#bfb
| 45 || May 24 || @ Tigers || 6–5 || Mejía (1–0) || Garcia (0–1) || Clase (8) || 7,832 || 25–20 || W1
|- style="background:#bfb
| 46 || May 25 || @ Tigers || 4–0 || Civale (7–1) || Skubal (1–7) || Karinchak (6) || 8,000 || 26–20 || W2
|- style="background:#fbb
| 47 || May 26 || @ Tigers || 0–1 || Fulmer (4–3) || Quantrill (0–1) || Soto (5) || 7,525 || 26–21 || L1
|- style="background:#bfb 
| 48|| May 27 || @ Tigers || 5–2 || Bieber (5–3) || Boyd (2–6) || — || 8,000 || 27–21 || W1
|- style="background:#fbb
| 49 || May 28 || Blue Jays || 2–11  || Ryu (5–2) || Morgan (0–1) || — || 9,198 || 27–22 || L1
|- style="background:#bbb 
| — || May 29 || Blue Jays || colspan=7 | Postponed (high winds) make-up date May 30
|- style="background:#fbb
| 50 || May 30  || Blue Jays || 1–4  || Stripling (1–3) || Civale (7–2) || Romano (3) || — || 27–23 || L2
|- style="background:#bfb 
| 51 || May 30  || Blue Jays || 6–5  || Clase (3–2) || Chatwood (0–2) || — || 11,690 || 28–23 || W1
|- style="background:#fbb
| 52 || May 31  || White Sox || 6–8  || Heuer (4–1) || Karinchak (2–2) || Bummer (1) || — || 28–24 || L1
|- style="background:#bfb
| 53 || May 31  || White Sox || 3–1  || Maton (1–0) || Lambert (0–1) || Clase (9) || 10,726 || 29–24 || W1
|-

|- style="background:#bfb 
| 54 || June 1 || White Sox || 6–5 || Bieber (6–3) || Cease (3–2) || Karinchak (7) || 7,132 || 30–24 || W2
|- style="background:#bbb 
| — || June 2 || White Sox || colspan=7 | Postponed (rain) make-up date September 23
|- style="background:#fbb
| 55 || June 4 || @ Orioles || 1–3 || Sulser (2–0) || Shaw (1–1) || Fry  (2) || 12,009 || 30–25 || L1
|- style="background:#bfb 
| 56 || June 5 || @ Orioles || 10–4 || Civale (8–2) || Means (4–2) ||  || 9,969 || 31–25 || W1
|- style="background:#fbb
| 57 || June 6 || @ Orioles || 5–18 || López (2–6) || Quantrill (0–2) ||  || 9,423 || 31–26 || L1
|- style="background:#bfb
| 58 || June 8 || @ Cardinals || 10–1 || Bieber (7–3) || Martínez (3–6) ||  || 16,178 || 32–26 || W1
|- style="background:#fbb 
| 59 || June 9 || @ Cardinals || 2–8 || Wainwright (4–5) || Mejía (0–1) ||  || 16,331 || 32–27 || L1
|- style="background:#bfb 
| 60 || June 11 || Mariners || 7–0 || Civale (9–2) || Dunn (1–3) ||  || 22,970 || 33–27 || W1
|- style="background:#bfb 
| 61 || June 12 || Mariners || 5–4  || Karinchak (3–2) || Sewald (2–2) ||  || 20,116 || 34–27 || W2
|- style="background:#fbb
| 62 || June 13 || Mariners || 2–6 || Gilbert (2–2) || Bieber (7–4) ||  || 17,371 || 34–28 || L1
|- style="background:#bfb
| 63 || June 14 || Orioles || 4–3 || Sandlin (1–0) || Kremer (3–6) || Clase (10) || 11,181 || 35–28 || W1
|- style="background:#bfb 
| 64 || June 15 || Orioles || 7–2 || Karinchak (4–2) || Harvey (3–8) ||  || 12,025 || 36–28 || W2
|- style="background:#bfb
| 65 || June 16 || Orioles || 8–7 || Civale (10–2) || Akin (0–2) || Clase (11) || 12,825 || 37–28 || W3
|- style="background:#bfb 
| 66 || June 17 || Orioles || 10–3 || Stephan (1–0) || López (2–8) || — || 15,121 || 38–28 || W4
|- style="background:#fbb
| 67 || June 18 || @ Pirates || 10–11 || Kuhl (1–4) || Mejía (1–2) || Rodriguez (8) || 16,965 || 38–29 || L1
|- style="background:#fbb 
| 68 || June 19 || @ Pirates || 3–6 || Stratton (2–0) || Shaw (1–2) || — || 16,830 || 38–30 || L2
|- style="background:#bfb
| 69 || June 20 || @ Pirates || 2–1 || Maton (2–0) || Brubaker (4–6) || Karinchak (8) || 16,582 || 39–30 || W1
|- style="background:#bfb
| 70 || June 21 || @ Cubs || 4–0 || Shaw (2–2) || Alzolay (4–6) ||  || 32,934 || 40–30 || W2
|- style="background:#fbb
| 71 || June 22 || @ Cubs || 1–7 || Hendricks (10–4) || Morgan (0–2) ||  || 35,493 || 40–31 || L1
|- style="background:#bfb 
| 72 || June 24 || @ Twins || 4–1 || Parker (1–0) || Alcalá (1–2) || Karinchak (9) || 18,812 || 41–31 || W1
|- style="background:#fbb
| 73 || June 25 || @ Twins || 7–8 || Jax (1–0) || Wittgren (2–2) || Robles (7) || 16,892 || 41–32 || L1
|- style="background:#bbb
| — || June 26 || @ Twins || colspan=7 | Postponed (rain) make-up date September 14
|- style="background:#fbb
| 74 || June 27 || @ Twins || 2–8 || Happ (4–3) || Hentges (1–2) ||  || 20,215 || 41–33 || L2
|- style="background:#bfb
| 75 || June 28 || Tigers || 13–5 || Morgan (1–2) || Manning (1–2) ||  || 13,128 || 42–33 || W1 
|- style="background:#bbb 
| — || June 29 || Tigers || colspan=7 | Postponed (rain) make-up date June 30
|- style="background:#fbb 
| 76 || June 30 || Tigers || 4–9  || Funkhouser (2–0) || Shaw (2–3) ||  || — || 42–34 || L1
|- style="background:#fbb
| 77 || June 30 || Tigers || 1–7  || Peralta (1–1) || Allen (1–5) ||  || 11,627 || 42–35 || L2
|-

|- style="background:#fbb
| 78 || July 1 || Astros || 2–7 || Valdez (5–1) || Mejía (1–3) ||  || 13,772 || 42–36 || L3
|- style="background:#fbb
| 79 || July 2 || Astros || 3–6 || McCullers Jr. (6–1) || Hentges (1–3) || Pressly (13) || 24,337 || 42–37 || L4
|- style="background:#fbb
| 80 || July 3 || Astros || 2–3 || Odorizzi (3–3)  || Morgan (1–3) || Pressly (14) || 24,961 || 42–38 || L5
|- style="background:#fbb 
| 81 || July 4 || Astros || 3–4  || Taylor (1–2) || Clase (3–3) || Raley (2) || 17,412 || 42–39 || L6
|- style="background:#fbb 
| 82 || July 5 || @ Rays || 8–9 || Fairbanks (2–3) || Clase (3–4) || || 8,832 || 42–40 || L7
|- style="background:#bbb
| — || July 6 || @ Rays || colspan=7 | Postponed (Tropical Storm Elsa) make-up date July 7
|- style="background:#fbb 
| 83 || July 7 || @ Rays || 1–8 || Wacha (2–2) || Mejía (1–4) ||  || — || 42–41 || L8
|- style="background:#fbb 
| 84 || July 7 || @ Rays || 0–4 || Fleming (7–4) || Hentges (1–4) ||  || 10,905 || 42–42 || L9
|- style="background:#bfb
| 85 || July 8 || Royals || 7–4 || Karinchak (5–2) || Holland (2–4) ||  || 13,272 || 43–42 || W1
|- style="background:#bfb
| 86 || July 9 || Royals || 2–1 || Karinchak (6–2) || Brentz (2–2) ||  || 21,395 || 44–42 || W2
|- style="background:#bfb
| 87 || July 10 || Royals || 14–6 || Quantrill (1–2) || Minor (6–8) ||  || 24,077 || 45–42 || W3
|- style="background:#bbb
| — || July 11 || Royals || colspan=7 | Postponed (rain) make-up date September 20
|- style="text-align:center; background:#bbcaff;"
| colspan="11" | 91st All-Star Game: Denver, CO
|- style="background:#fbb;" 
| 88 || July 16 || @ Athletics || 4–5 || Romo (1–0) || Clase (3–5) ||  || 12,361 || 45–43 || L1
|- style="background:#bfb 
| 89 || July 17 || @ Athletics || 3–2 || Quantrill (2–2) || Montas (8–8) || Karinchak (10) || 11,374 || 46–43 || W1
|- style="background:#bfb 
| 90 || July 18 || @ Athletics || 4–2 || Plesac (5–3) || Bassitt (10–3) || Shaw (2) || 8,572 || 47–43 || W2
|- style="background:#fbb 
| 91 || July 19 || @ Astros || 3–4 || Greinke (9–3) || Mejía (1–5) || Pressly (17) || 21,963 || 47–44 || L1
|- style="background:#fbb
| 92 || July 20 || @ Astros || 3–9 || García (7–5) || McKenzie (1–4) ||  || 26,586 || 47–45 || L2
|- style="background:#bfb 
| 93 || July 21 || @ Astros || 5–4 || Shaw (3–3) || Pruitt (0–1) || Karinchak (11) || 21,712 || 48–45 || W1
|- style="background:#fbb 
| 94 || July 22 || Rays || 4–5  || Fairbanks (3–3) || Shaw (3–4) || Castillo (14) || 19,338 || 48–46 || L1
|- style="background:#fbb 
| 95 || July 23 || Rays || 5–10 || Wisler (3–3) || Wittgren (2–3) ||  || 23,180 || 48–47 || L2
|- style="background:#fbb
| 96 || July 24 || Rays || 2–8 || Head (1–0) || Mejía (1–6) ||  || 23,194 || 48–48 || L3
|- style="background:#bfb 
| 97 || July 25 || Rays || 3–2 || Karinchak (7–2) || Wisler (3–4) || Clase (12) || 18,614 || 49–48 || W1
|- style="background:#fbb
| 98 || July 27 || Cardinals || 2–4 || Wainwright (8–6) || Shaw (3–5) || Reyes (24) || 19,480 || 49–49 || L1
|- style="background:#bfb 
| 99 || July 28 || Cardinals || 7–2 || Plesac (6–3) || Kim (6–6) ||  || 19,927 || 50–49 || W1
|- style="background:#fbb 
| 100 || July 30 || @ White Sox || 4–6 || Ruiz (1–1) || Karinchak (7–3) || Hendriks (26) || 36,123 || 50–50 || L1
|- style="background:#bfb
| 101 || July 31 || @ White Sox || 12–11 || Garza (1–0) || Kopech (3–1) || Clase (13) || 35,866 || 51–50 || W1
|-

|- style="background:#fbb 
| 102 || August 1 || @ White Sox || 1–2 || Hendriks (5–2) || Wittgren (2–4) ||  || 34,344 || 51–51 || L1
|- style="background:#bfb 
| 103 || August 2 || @ Blue Jays || 5–2  || Shaw (4–5) || Hand (5–6) || Clase (14) || 14,653 || 52–51 || W1
|- style="background:#fbb 
| 104 || August 3 || @ Blue Jays || 2–7 || Ryu (11–5) || Plesac (6–4) ||  || 14,270 || 52–52 || L1
|- style="background:#fbb
| 105 || August 4 || @ Blue Jays || 6–8 || Matz (9–6) || Mejía (1–7) ||  || 14,410 || 52–53 || L2
|- style="background:#fbb
| 106 || August 5 || @ Blue Jays || 0–3 || Stripling (5–6) || McKenzie (1–5) || Cimber (1) || 14,289 || 52–54 || L3
|- style="background:#bfb
| 107 || August 6 || Tigers || 6–1 || Quantrill (3–2) || Manning (2–5) || Clase (15) || 24,485 || 53–54 || W1
|- style="background:#fbb 
| 108 || August 7 || Tigers || 1–2 || Alexander (2–1) || Morgan (1–4) || Soto (13) || 24,560 || 53–55 || L1
|- style="background:#bfb
| 109 || August 8 || Tigers || 7–5 || Shaw (5–5) || Ramírez (1–1) || Clase (16) || 19,899 || 54–55 || W1
|- style="background:#bfb
| 110 || August 9 || Reds || 9–3 || Garza (2–0) || Castillo (6–11) ||  || 10,708 || 55–55 || W2
|- style="background:#fbb 
| 111 || August 10 || Athletics || 3–4  || Trivino (5–4) || Wittgren (2–5) || Chafin (1) || 13,041 || 55–56 || L1
|- style="background:#fbb 
| 112 || August 11 || Athletics || 3–6 || Diekman (3–2) || Sandlin (1–1) || Trivino (19) || 13,560 || 55–57 || L2
|- style="background:#fbb 
| 113 || August 12 || Athletics || 0–17 || Bassitt (12–3) || Morgan (1–5) ||  || 16,559 || 55–58 || L3
|- style="background:#bfb
| 114 || August 13 || @ Tigers || 7–4 || Plesac (7–4) || Alexander (2–2) ||  || 22,107 || 56–58 || W1
|- style="background:#fbb 
| 115 || August 14 || @ Tigers || 4–6 || Fulmer (5–4) || Shaw (5–6) || Soto (15) || 32,845 || 56–59 || L1
|- style="background:#bfb
| 116 || August 15 || @ Tigers || 11–0 || McKenzie (2–5) || Hutchinson (0–1) ||  || 25,684 || 57–59 || W1
|- style="background:#fbb 
| 117 || August 16 || @ Twins || 4–5  || Thielbar (5–0) || Wittgren (2–6) ||  || 15,622 || 57–60 || L1
|- style="background:#bfb 
| 118 || August 17 || @ Twins || 3–1 || Morgan (2–5) || Ober (1–2) || Clase (17) || 19,605 || 58–60 || W1
|- style="background:#fbb 
| 119 || August 18 || @ Twins || 7–8  || Coulombe (3–1) || Garza (2–1) ||  || 19,949 || 58–61 || L1
|- style="background:#bfb
| 120 || August 20 || Angels || 9–1 || Stephan (2–0) || Barría (2–2) ||  || 22,755 || 59–61 || W1
|- style="background:#bfb
| 121 || August 21 || Angels || 5–1 || McKenzie (3–5) || Detmers (1–3) ||  || 31,406 || 60–61 || W2
|- style="background:#bfb
| 122 || August 22 || Angels || 3–0 || Quantrill (4–2) || Suarez (5–7) || Clase (18) || 1,832 || 61–61 || W3
|- style="background:#fbb
| 123 || August 24 || Rangers || 3–7 || Hearn (3–4) || Morgan (2–6) ||  || 11,369 || 61–62 || L1
|- style="background:#bfb
| 124 || August 25 || Rangers || 7–2 || Plesac (8–4) || Latz (0–1) ||  || 11,398 || 62–62 || W1
|- style="background:#bfb 
| 125 || August 26 || Rangers || 10–6 || Stephan (3–0) || Lyles (6–11) || — || 10,827 || 63–62 || W2
|- style="background:#fbb 
| 126 || August 27 || Red Sox || 3–4 || Rodriguez (10–7) || Karinchak (7–4) || Ottavino (9) || 20,881 || 63–63 || L1
|- style="background:#fbb
| 127 || August 28 || Red Sox || 3–5  || Whitlock (6–2) || Wittgren (2–7) || Ottavino (10) || 26,221 || 63–64 || L2
|- style="background:#bfb 
| 128 || August 29 || Red Sox || 7–5 || Shaw (6–6) || Davis (0–2) || Clase (19) || 22,883 || 64–64 || W1
|- style="background:#bfb 
| 129 || August 31 || @ Royals || 7–2 || Plesac (9–4) || Junis (2–4) || — || 11,542 || 65–64 || W2
|-

|- style="background:#bfb
| 130 || September 1 || @ Royals || 5–3  || Parker (2–0) || Santana (1–2) || Stephan (1) || 10,516 || 66–64 || W3
|- style="background:#bfb 
| 131 || September 2 || @ Royals || 4–2 || McKenzie (4–5) || Minor (8–12) || Clase (20) || 10,042 || 67–64 || W4
|- style="background:#fbb
| 132 || September 3 || @ Red Sox || 5–8 || Ottavino (4–3) || Quantrill (4–3) || Whitlock (2)  || 31,127 || 67–65 || L1
|- style="background:#fbb 
| 133 || September 4 || @ Red Sox || 3–4 || Ottavino (5–3) || Shaw (6–7) ||  || 33,081 || 67–66 || L2 
|- style="background:#bfb
| 134 || September 5 || @ Red Sox || 11–5 || Plesac (10–4) || Crawford (0–1) || Clase (21) || 27,578 || 68–66 || W1
|- style="background:#fbb
| 135 || September 6 || Twins || 2–5 || Pineda (5–8) || Allen (1–6) || Colomé (12) || 12,675 || 68–67 || L1
|- style="background:#fbb 
| 136 || September 7 || Twins || 0–3 || Gant (5–9) || Civale (10–3) || Colomé (13) || 10,448 || 68–68 || L2
|- style="background:#fbb 
| 137 || September 8 || Twins || 0–3 || Ryan (1–1) || McKenzie (4–6) || Duffey (3) || 11,037 || 68–69 || L3
|- style="background:#bfb
| 138 || September 9 || Twins || 4–1 || Quantrill (5–3) || Albers (1–2) || Clase (22) || 11,846 || 69–69 || W1
|- style="background:#fbb 
| 139 || September 10 || Brewers || 3–10 || Houser (9–6) || Morgan (2–7) ||  || 17,667 || 69–70 || L1
|- style="background:#fbb 
| 140 || September 11 || Brewers || 0–3 || Burnes (10–4) || Plesac (10–5) || Hader (31) || 20,100 || 69–71 || L2
|- style="background:#fbb 
| 141 || September 12 || Brewers || 1–11 || Lauer (6–5) || Civale (10–4) || Ashby (1) || 16,332 || 69–72 || L3
|- style="background:#bfb 
| 142 || September 14  || @ Twins || 3–1  || McKenzie (5–6) || Coulombe (3–2) || Clase (23) || 15,319 || 70–72 || W1
|- style="background:#fbb
| 143 || September 14  || @ Twins || 3–6  || Barraclough (1–0) || Allen (1–7) || Colomé (14) || 18,905 || 70–73 || L1
|- style="background:#bfb 
| 144 || September 15 || @ Twins || 12–3 || Quantrill (6–3) || Jax (3–4) ||  || 14,222 || 71–73 || W1
|- style="background:#fbb 
| 145 || September 17 || @ Yankees || 0–8 || Kluber (5–3) || Plesac (10–6) ||  || 31,403 || 71–74 || L1
|- style="background:#bfb 
| 146 || September 18 || @ Yankees || 11–3 || Civale (11–4) || Gil (1–1) ||  || 39,088 || 72–74 || W1
|- style="background:#bfb 
| 147 || September 19 || @ Yankees || 11–1 || Morgan (3–7) || Cole (15–8) ||  || 34,110 || 73–74 || W2
|- style="background:#fbb 
| 148 || September 20  || Royals || 2–7  || Singer (5–10) || McKenzie (5–7) ||  || — || 73–75 || L1
|- style="background:#fbb
| 149 || September 20  || Royals || 2–4  || Tapia (3–0) || Wittgren (2–8) || Barlow (14) || 11,459 || 73–76 || L2
|- style="background:#bfb
| 150 || September 21 || Royals || 4–1 || Quantrill (7–3) || Lynch (4–6) || Clase (24) || 23,341 || 74–76 || W1
|- style="background:#bbb
| — || September 22 || Royals || colspan=7 | Postponed (rain) make-up date September 27
|- style="background:#fbb 
| 151 || September 23  || White Sox || 2–7  || Bummer (4–5) || Civale (11–5) || — || 11,851 || 74–77 || L1
|- style="background:#bfb 
| 152 || September 23  || White Sox || 5–3  || Clase (4–5) || Ruiz (1–3) ||  || 11,336 || 75–77 || W1
|- style="background:#fbb
| 153 || September 24 || White Sox || 0–1 || Cease (13–7) || Stephan (3–1) || Hendriks (35) || 18,576 || 75–78 || L1
|- style="background:#bfb
| 154 || September 25 || White Sox || 6–0 || Morgan (4–7) || Lynn (10–6) ||  || 24,082 || 76–78 || W1
|- style="background:#fbb
| 155 || September 26 || White Sox || 2–5 || Giolito (11–9) || McKenzie (5–8) || Hendriks (36) || 21,957 || 76–79 || L1
|- style="background:#bfb 
| 156 || September 27 || Royals || 8–3 || Quantrill (8–3) || Kowar (0–5) ||  || 13,121 || 77–79 || W1
|- style="background:#fbb 
| 157 || September 28 || @ Royals || 4–6 || Staumont (4–3) || Parker (2–1) ||  || 11,670 || 77–80 || L1
|- style="background:#fbb 
| 158 || September 29 || @ Royals || 5–10 || Holland (3–5) || Wittgren (2–9) ||  || 10,373 || 77–81 || L2
|- style="background:#bfb 
| 159 || September 30 || @ Royals || 6–1 || Allen (2–7) || Zerpa (0–1) ||  || 11,288 || 78–81 || W1
|- style="background:#bfb 
| 160 || October 1 || @ Rangers || 9–6 || Morgan (5–7) || Howard (0–5) ||  || 22,700 || 79–81 || W2
|- style="background:#fbb 
| 161 || October 2 || @ Rangers || 2–7 || Lyles (10–13) || McKenzie (5–9) ||  || 27,362 || 79–82 || L1
|- style="background:#bfb
| 162 || October 3 || @ Rangers || 6–0 || Civale (12–5) || Dunning (5–10) ||  || 28,396 || 80–82 || W1
|-

|- style="text-align:center;"
| Legend:       = Win       = Loss       = PostponementBold = Indians team memberPlayer stats
BattingNote: G = Games played; AB = At bats; R = Runs; H = Hits; 2B = Doubles; 3B = Triples; HR = Home runs; RBI = Runs batted in; AVG = Batting average; SB = Stolen basesPitchingNote: W = Wins; L = Losses; ERA = Earned run average; G = Games pitched; GS = Games started; SV = Saves; IP = Innings pitched; H = Hits allowed; R = Total runs allowed; ER = Earned runs allowed; BB = Walks allowed; K = StrikeoutsRoster

Farm system

References

External links
Cleveland Indians 2021 Schedule at MLB.com
2021 Cleveland Indians season at Baseball Reference''

Cleveland Guardians seasons
Cleveland
Cleveland Indians